Tricomaria is a genus in the Malpighiaceae, a family of about 75 genera of flowering plants in the order Malpighiales. Tricomaria includes one species, Tricomaria usillo, which occurs in dry vegetation in western Argentina on the eastern side of the Andes.

External links
Tricomaria

Malpighiaceae
Malpighiaceae genera
Monotypic Malpighiales genera